Alex Ireeta Nabudere is a Ugandan Film editor and cinematographer.

Career
Alex Ireeta is a Ugandan multi award-winning Cinematographer / Director of Photography and film Editor with over 15 years experience in filmmaking, previously working under the filmmaking outfit 'YesThatsUs'. Best known for his collaborations with directors like Sadiq (Don) Mugisha, Bashir Lukyamuzi, Usama Mukwaya, Steve Ayenye, Allan Manzi & Rehema Nanfuka.

Alex attended the Berlin Film Festival in February 2012 and is an alumini of Berlinale Talents 2012.

In 2014, Alex shot with director Lukyamuzi Bashir his debut film as director of photography  Bala Bala Sese.

As cinematographer, Alex has shot several award-winning film projects including Bodaboda Thieves, Veronica’s Wish, Kony: Order From Above, Love Faces, Kyaddala TV series for RAHU, TV commercials for MTN, UHMG, Airtel and several music videos for Juliana, Peter Miles, Chameleon, A Pass, Elephant Man, Demarco, General Levi among many others.

Awards

Won
 2017: Best Cinematography, 7th Pearl International Film Festival
 2018: Best Cinematography, 8th Pearl International Film Festival
 2018: Best Cinematography, Viewer's Choice Movie Awards
 2018: Best Cinematography, Uganda Film Festival
 2018: Best Editing and Post Production, Uganda Film Festival

References

External links
 

Living people
Ugandan cinematographers
1982 births